The Burka Band (or the Blue Burqa Band) is an all-female indie rock band from Kabul, Afghanistan since 2002. They perform anonymously, all of the members wearing burqas in an apparent protest against the Taliban's rules regarding Islamic dress. They released a single, "Burka Blue" and a self-titled album in 2002. The group gained some popularity in Europe in the 2000s, and toured in Germany, where one of their songs was remixed by the DJ Barbara Morgenstern. A YouTube video of a performance of theirs has circulated widely. Singing in burqas was a joke, but also necessary to avoid retaliation by religious fanatics, according to Nargiz, a member of the band.

References

Afghan rock music groups
Afghan women musicians